Amblyseius nemorivagus is a species of mite in the family Phytoseiidae.

References

nemorivagus
Articles created by Qbugbot
Animals described in 1961